Versailles is a historic home located at Burgess, Northumberland County, Virginia.  It was built between 1853 and 1857, and is a -story, five-bay, frame I-house dwelling with Greek Revival style design elements.  It measures approximately 46 feet by 30 feet, and is topped by a gable roof.  The front facade features a two-story pedimented entrance porch with a classical entablature and second floor balcony.

It was listed on the National Register of Historic Places in 1997.

References

Houses on the National Register of Historic Places in Virginia
Greek Revival houses in Virginia
I-houses in Virginia
Houses completed in 1857
Houses in Northumberland County, Virginia
National Register of Historic Places in Northumberland County, Virginia
1857 establishments in Virginia